Ionel Augustin (born 11 October 1955) is a Romanian retired footballer who played as a striker.

Club career
Ionel Augustin, nicknamed Oneață was born on 11 October 1955 in Bucharest and started to play football in 1966 at junior level at Dinamo București, making his Divizia A debut for the senior squad on 23 April 1975 in a 5–0 victory against Chimia Râmnicu Vâlcea. He spent eleven seasons with Dinamo, winning four Divizia A titles, in the first he played 5 games, in the second he played 31 games and scored 7 goals, in the third he made 31 appearances with 14 goals and in the last one he scored 17 goals in 31 matches, also winning three Cupa României. He played a total of 33 games and scored 10 goals in European competitions, managing to reach the 1983–84 European Cup semi-finals with Dinamo, playing 7 games and scoring 3 goals in the campaign. Augustin also played for Jiul Petroşani, Victoria București and Rapid București, having a total of 383 Divizia A matches in which he scored 111 goals. Augustin ended his career in 1990 after playing two seasons in Divizia B for Chimia Râmnicu Vâlcea and Unirea Slobozia.

International career
Ionel Augustin played 34 matches and scored 3 goals for Romania, making his debut on 13 December 1978 under coach Ștefan Kovacs in a friendly which ended with a 2–1 loss against Greece. He played two games in which he scored one goal at the Euro 1980 qualifiers, he played in the first leg of the 1977–80 Balkan Cup final, which ended with a 2–0 defeat against Yugoslavia, he played two games 1982 World Cup qualifiers and he played 6 games at the successful Euro 1984 qualifiers, also being selected by coach Mircea Lucescu to be part of the Euro 1984 squad, playing in a group game against Portugal which ended with a 1–0 loss. Augustin played in a 3–2 loss against Northern Ireland at the 1986 World Cup qualifiers, his last two games played for the national team being friendlies, a 1–1 and a 0–0 against Iraq, Augustin scoring Romania's goal in the first one.

International goals
Scores and results list Romania's goal tally first, score column indicates score after each Augustin goal.

Honours
Dinamo București
Divizia A: 1974–75, 1981–82, 1982–83, 1983–84
Cupa României: 1981–82, 1983–84, 1985–86
Trofeo Costa de Valencia: 1978

References

External links

1955 births
Living people
Footballers from Bucharest
Romanian footballers
Romania international footballers
Liga I players
Liga II players
Victoria București players
FC Dinamo București players
CSM Jiul Petroșani players
FC Rapid București players
AFC Unirea Slobozia players
UEFA Euro 1984 players
Romanian football managers
FC Dinamo București managers
FC Gloria Buzău managers
ASC Daco-Getica București managers
AFC Dacia Unirea Brăila managers
LPS HD Clinceni managers
Association football forwards